The Miodet is a  stream in the Auvergne region. It originates in the Livradois and joins the Dore (left bank), whereby it is a sub-affluent of the Loire.

Geography 
It runs almost entirely through wooded areas. It first runs south, before turning north-west at le sommet du Grun du Bois, elevation . It is joined by le ruisseau des Martinanches at Saint-Dier-d'Auvergne, then veers north-east. It runs north shortly before its confluence with the Dore on the left bank.

It is located in the Livradois-Forez Regional Natural Park.

Affluents 
The Miodet has 3 recorded tributaries:

le Croizat
les Martinanches
les Palles

Communes 
The course of the steam runs by or through :

 Saint-Éloy-la-Glacière
 Auzelles
 Brousse
 Saint-Jean-des-Ollières
 Estandeuil
 Saint-Dier-d'Auvergne
 Domaize
 Saint-Flour

References 

Rivers of France
Rivers of Auvergne-Rhône-Alpes
Rivers of Puy-de-Dôme